The list includes the city, country, the codes of the International Air Transport Association (IATA airport code) and the International Civil Aviation Organization (ICAO airport code), and the airport's name, with the airline's hubs marked. The list also contains the beginning and end year of services, with destinations marked if the services was not continual and if they are seasonal, and for dates which occur in the future.

Destinations

Air Nostrum, branded as Iberia Regional, serves the following destinations:

References

Lists of airline destinations
Oneworld affiliate destinations